2009 in Zambia refers to the events that occurred the year  2009 in the Republic of Zambia.

Crime
 Regina Chiluba, wife of former President Frederick Chiluba, was arrested on charges of fraud. On 3 March, she was sentenced to three and half years for illegally receiving government funds and properties.

Deaths
 6 March: Christon Tembo, former Vice President and Military commander

References

 
2000s in Zambia
Years of the 21st century in Zambia
Zambia
Zambia